Lesroy James Irish (born 29 February 1972) is a former Montserratian cricketer.  Irish was a left-handed batsman who bowled right-arm fast-medium.

Irish made his first-class debut for the Leeward Islands against the Windward Islands in the 1996/97 Red Stripe Cup.  He made four further first-class appearances for the Leeward Islands, the last of which came against the Windward Islands in the 1997/98 West Indies Board President's Cup.  In his five first-class matches, he took 13 wickets at an average of 26.76, with best figures of 2/14.  Irish later appeared in List A cricket, playing two matches in that format for a Rest of Leeward Islands team in the 2001/02 Red Stripe Bowl, against Jamaica and Northern Windward Islands.  He took 4 wickets in his two List A matches, which came at an average of 15.25, with best figures of 2/22.

He later played in England for Herefordshire in the 2007 Minor Counties Championship, making an appearance each against Wales Minor Counties and Wiltshire.

References

External links
Lesroy Irish at ESPNcricinfo
Lesroy Irish at CricketArchive

1972 births
Living people
Montserratian cricketers
Leeward Islands cricketers
Herefordshire cricketers